Michael Anthony Coop (born 10 July 1948) is an English former professional footballer, who played as a right back.

Born in Grimsby, Lincolnshire, Coop grew up in Leamington Spa, Warwickshire, where he was an excellent school boy cricketer and footballer. He joined Coventry City F.C. as an apprentice in 1962. In January 1966, he turned professional with Coventry and soon made his first team debut. A run of poor form during the 1974-1975 season led to the exciting Graham Oakey replacing him on the back line and Coop went on loan to York City F.C. for four games. When he returned to Coventry, he regained his starting position.

In the summer of 1979, Coventry sent him on loan to the Detroit Express of the North American Soccer League. In July 1981, he transferred to Derby County F.C. for £20,000 where he played half a season before retiring in January 1982. He later played a few games for AP Leamington. After retirement he worked as a coach at Coventry City and was an antiques dealer.

He and his wife live in Wellesbourne, Warwickshire.

Honours 
 Coventry City F.C. Hall of Fame

References

External links
 
 NASL stats
 Mick Coop: Coventry City F.C. at Sporting-Heroes.net

1948 births
Living people
Coventry City F.C. players
Derby County F.C. players
Detroit Express players
English footballers
English expatriate footballers
Leamington F.C. players
North American Soccer League (1968–1984) players
York City F.C. players
English Football League players
Association football fullbacks
English expatriate sportspeople in the United States
Expatriate soccer players in the United States